Multi-Lamellar Emulsion (MLE) is an oil-in-water (O/W) emulsion showing multi-lamellar structure and an original technology developed by NeoPharm in South Korea.

MLE is made with NeoPharm's proprietary pseudo-ceramide PC-9S. Lamellar structure, also observed in stratum corneum, is defined as a thin plate or membrane of skin lipids. MLE shows multiple layers of this lamellar structure, and as a moisturizer, MLE offers long-lasting skin moisturizing effects through reinforcing the skin's natural barrier function.

Under cross polarized microscopy, skin lipids and MLE show the similar cross-like structure, termed as Maltese cross structure, and under electron microscopy, lamellar structures are observed. Stratum corneum, as the outermost layer of skin, is responsible for the various barrier function of skin and protects our body from external harmful things.

Stratum corneum lipids are elaborately organized into lamellar structure, which plays the most important role for skin's barrier functions. Unlike the conventional moisturizers made with humectants or emollients, MLE can restore and improve the barrier function of skin, with its distinctive structural similarity to the native human skin's lamellar structure. Restoring the skin barrier function can improve skin hydration and protect skin from external irritants.

The efficacy of MLE on skin barrier was proven by several clinical studies performed in independent University Hospitals and reported in peer-reviewed academic journals, including Journal of Investigative Dermatology, one of the most renowned journals in the field of dermatology. Along with its therapeutic benefits, MLE also shows non-sticky textures, allowing quick absorption after application.

As an O/W emulsion, MLE can be also used as a vehicle (carrier) for topical drugs. The multiple layer of MLE offers stabilization of active pharmaceutical ingredient (API) and efficient penetration of API into skin.

Multi-Lamellar Emulsion (MLE) is an oil-in-water (O/W) emulsion showing multi-lamellar structure and an original technology developed by NeoPharm in South Korea.

MLE is made with NeoPharm's proprietary pseudo-ceramide PC-9S. Lamellar structure, also observed in stratum corneum, is defined as a thin plate or membrane of skin lipids. MLE shows multiple layers of this lamellar structure, and as a moisturizer, MLE offers long-lasting skin moisturizing effects through reinforcing the skin's natural barrier function.

Under cross polarized microscopy, skin lipids and MLE show the similar cross-like structure, termed as Maltese cross structure, and under electron microscopy, lamellar structures are observed. Stratum corneum, as the outermost layer of skin, is responsible for the various barrier function of skin and protects our body from external harmful things.

Stratum corneum lipids are elaborately organized into lamellar structure, which plays the most important role for skin's barrier functions. Unlike the conventional moisturizers made with humectants or emollients, MLE can restore and improve the barrier function of skin, with its distinctive structural similarity to the native human skin's lamellar structure. Restoring the skin barrier function can improve skin hydration and protect skin from external irritants.

The efficacy of MLE on skin barrier was proven by several clinical studies performed in independent University Hospitals and reported in peer-reviewed academic journals, including Journal of Investigative Dermatology, one of the most renowned journals in the field of dermatology. Along with its therapeutic benefits, MLE also shows non-sticky textures, allowing quick absorption after application.

As an O/W emulsion, MLE can be also used as a vehicle (carrier) for topical drugs. The multiple layer of MLE offers stabilization of active pharmaceutical ingredient (API) and efficient penetration of API into skin.

References

External links
 NeoPharm Co., Ltd.

Dosage forms
Cosmetics